Group B of the 2019 Africa Cup of Nations took place from 22 to 30 June 2019. The group consisted of Burundi, Guinea, Madagascar and Nigeria.

Madagascar and Nigeria as the top two teams, along with Guinea as one of the four best third-placed teams, advanced to the round of 16.

Teams

Notes

Standings

In the round of 16:
 The winners of Group B, Madagascar advanced to play the third-placed team of Group A, DR Congo.
 The runners-up of Group B, Nigeria advanced to play the runners-up of Group F, Cameroon.
 The third-placed team of Group B, Guinea, advanced to play the winners of Group C, Algeria.

Matches

Nigeria vs Burundi

Guinea vs Madagascar

Nigeria vs Guinea

Madagascar vs Burundi

Madagascar vs Nigeria

Burundi vs Guinea

References

External links
 

2019 Africa Cup of Nations